The China–Nepal border is the international boundary between the Tibet Autonomous Region of the People's Republic of China and Federal Democratic Republic of Nepal. The boundaries of this particular border have changed dramatically over time, especially when considering relatively recent events such as the Annexation of Tibet in 1949. However, some of the most significant developments of modern times would be the signing of the "Agreement on Maintaining Friendly Relations between the People’s Republic of China and the Kingdom of Nepal" in 1956 and the "Sino-Nepalese Treaty of Peace and Friendship" in 1960, both of which formally recognised Tibet as a part of China and confirmed the limits of the countries of China and Nepal as they are known today.

Description

The border starts in the west at the western tripoint with India near the Tinkar Pass in Sudurpashchim Province. It then proceeds south-east to the Urai Pass and then north-east, briefly utilising the Karnali River, before turning to the south-east at the Lapche Pass. It then proceeds in that general direction over various mountains crests in the Himalayan range, including Mount Everest, Mount Makalu and Mount Salasungo, as passes such as the Manja, Thau, Marima, Pindu, Gyala, Lajing and Popti Passes. It terminates at the eastern tripoint with India on Jongsong Peak.

History
The border region has historically existed at the edges of various Nepali, Indian and Tibetan kingdoms. Cross-border trade between Nepalis and Tibetans has existed for centuries, for example in wool, tea, spices and salt. Though various Nepali-Tibetan treaties were signed in the 18th-19th centuries, these concerned the ownership of often vaguely-defined territories rather than with delimiting a precise boundary.

In 1950-51 China annexed Tibet, and thereby inherited the somewhat confused situation along the boundary. On 21 March 1960 a border treaty was signed which recognised the "traditional customary line" and created a joint boundary commission to delimit a more precise border. Having completed their work, a final boundary treaty was signed on 5 October 1961. The border was then demarcated on the ground with pillars, and a final protocol signed on 23 January 1963.

Humla border dispute 

The western China–Nepal–India tripoint is disputed between Nepal and India since 1990s as part of Kalapani territory. In 2015, the Nepalese parliament objected to the agreement between India and China to trade through Lipulekh stating that 'it violates Nepal's sovereign rights over the disputed territory'.  After Indian prime minister Narendra Modi's visit to China in 2015, India and China agreed to open a trading post in Lipulekh, raising objections from Nepal.

In November 2020, Nepali politicians claimed China had annexed more than 150 hectares of Nepal land. The Nepali government in September 2021 formed a team under Home Ministry Joint Secretary Jaya Narayan Acharya to study dispute in Limi of Namkha Rural Municipality of Humla. The committee comprised Deputy Director General of the Survey Department Sushil Dangol, Senior Superintendent of Nepal Police Umesh Raj Joshi, Senior Superintendent of Armed Police Force Pradip Kumar Pal, Joint Director of National Investigation Department Kishor Kumar Shrestha and Home Ministry Secretary Acharya. This team submitted its report on 26 September which brought the conclusion of claim being truth. It suggested making a joint force for dispute resolution.

In addition, NC Karnali Provincial Assembly party and former minister Jeevan Bahadur Shahi lead team had submitted report on same asking to bring back Nepalese land. This matter was raised and supported by NC vice-president and former Home minister Bimalendra Nidhi who was Deputy Prime minister in Second Dahal cabinet.

In early 2022, a Nepali government report was leaked. The report indicated the previously alleged buildings were on Chinese side, but found that China has built fences, a canal, and a road that encroached on Nepali soil.

Border crossings

In 2012, Nepal and China agreed to open new ports of entry, to a total of six official ports. Three of the ports are designated as international ports, while three others are only designated for bilateral trade.

The border crossing between Zhangmu and Kodari on the Friendship Highway has been in operation since 1968. In 2014, the border crossing at Rasuwa Fort (Rasuwagadhi) was opened for commerce and then for foreign nationals from 2017. In addition, this border crossing is being considered for a future rail crossing between the two countries.

Other crossings, like the one at Burang-Hilsa near the western tripoint, while not widely accessible have been used for local trade between China and Nepal for many years. Some of those crossings have become so important for local trade that in 2008, when Chinese tightened its border control during the Olympics, villages like Kimathanka faced food shortages due to disruption of local trade. Historically, there are even more border crossings. The crossing at Korala between Upper Mustang and Tibet for example was a major salt trade route, however it was closed due to Tibetan guerrilla activity in the 1960s. It remains closed for most of the year to this day, except when opening for limited local trade during the semi-annual cross-border trade fairs.

Galleries

Historical maps of the border from west to east in the International Map of the World and Operational Navigation Chart, middle/late 20th century:

See also
 China-Nepal relations

References

Further reading

External links 

 

 
Borders of China
Borders of Nepal
International borders